Chramesus is a genus of crenulate bark beetles in the family Curculionidae. There are at least 100 described species in Chramesus.

See also
 List of Chramesus species

References

Further reading

 
 
 
 
 

Scolytinae